Prince Oleg Konstantinovich of Russia ( – ) was a son of Grand Duke Constantine Constantinovich.

He died of wounds suffered in battle against the Germans during World War I.

Early life
Prince Oleg was generally considered to be the brightest of Grand Duke Konstantine's children. He had great curiosity and created complicated fantasy games for himself and his siblings to play.

Grand Duke Konstantin, a poet himself, arranged for his children to receive lessons from experts in a variety of fields. Well-known archaeologists told the children about their latest expeditions, architects showed the children slides and explained their works, choirs of Old Believers and peasants from all corners of the empire were brought to sing church music or folk songs to the children. Oleg was so intelligent that his father decided to send him to a prestigious school, the Alexander Lyceum, rather than to give him the standard military education that the other men in the family received. Konstantin's unconventional choice of education for Prince Oleg met with disapproval from his family members. Oleg was Grand Duke Konstantin's favorite son.

At one point he reportedly hoped to marry a cousin, Princess Nadezhda Petrovna of Russia, but this hope was prevented by the advent of World War I.

Service in World War I and death
Prince Oleg, with four of his brothers, served in the Guards during World War I. He was wounded while fighting against the Germans near Vladislavovas (today Kudirkos Naumiestis). Emergency surgery in Vilna (today Vilnius) could not save him. As he was dying, he said, "I am so happy. It will encourage the troops to know that the Imperial House is not afraid to shed its blood."

Ancestry

Notes

1892 births
1914 deaths
Princes of royal blood (Russia)
Imperial Russian Army personnel
Russian military personnel killed in World War I
19th-century people from the Russian Empire